Browndown is a  biological Site of Special Scientific Interest in Gosport in Hampshire.

This is a shingle beach owned by the Ministry of Defence, which has areas of heather, grass heath and gorse. There are a range of invertebrates specialising in these habitats, including 90 flies, 60 aculeata and 83 true bugs, including the rare Dalman's leatherbug.

References

 
Sites of Special Scientific Interest in Hampshire